The Monastery of St. John the Baptist is a former Eastern Orthodox monastery that is part of the Meteora monastery complex in Thessaly, central Greece.

It is located on a rock directly adjacent to the Monastery of St. Nicholas Anapausas. The rock on which the monastery was built was the residence of Athanasius the Meteorite during the 14th century. Theophanes and Nektarios Apsarades, the founders of the Monastery of Varlaam, also lived on the rock for seven years before they built Varlaam.

References

Meteora